William Ramsay Smith  (27 November 1859 – 28 September 1937), frequently referred to as Ramsay Smith, was a Scottish physician, educator, naturalist, anthropologist and civil servant, who worked in South Australia after moving there at the age of about 37 in 1896. He was initially appointed as a pathologist at the Royal Adelaide Hospital and was later appointed to other roles, including that of city coroner in Adelaide, but his legacy has been marred by allegations of misuse of human remains. He made a study of Aboriginal Australians, and sent body parts to Edinburgh University's anthropological collection. He published a number of books and articles in scientific journals, and in 1930 published a work under his own name which was later found to be the work of Ngarrindjeri Elder David Unaipon.

Early life
Smith was born in King Edward, Aberdeenshire, Scotland, the son of William Smith (a farm servant, and later stationmaster) and his wife Mary née MacDonald (domestic servant). They lived on the estate of Cairnbanno House near New Deer. He attended the nearby Cairnbanno Public School (which taught using the Madras School system - all pupils also teaching). Winning a Free Church scholarship, from 1877 he studied arts at Edinburgh University and then attended Moray House Training College to train as a teacher for two years.

Career
At 20 years of age Smith was appointed headmaster of Invergordon Public School, in Easter Ross, but, due to an interest in physiology, he returned to Edinburgh University to study arts and science. He then won an entrance scholarship for Medicine of £100 a year for three years. On completing his medical course in 1885 Smith was appointed assistant-professor of natural history, senior demonstrator of zoology at Edinburgh University. He graduated BSc (natural sciences) in 1888.

In 1889 'Illustrations of Zoology' was published which he had prepared in collaboration with J. S. Norwell. He graduated MB ChM in 1892. For two years Smith was demonstrator of anatomy at Edinburgh, and served as examiner at the Royal College of Physicians of Edinburgh. During this period he lived at 4 Grange Loan in the south of Edinburgh.

Australia
In 1896 Smith travelled to Australia at the request of the Government of South Australia to fill a pathology position at the Royal Adelaide Hospital. Smith was expelled from the British Medical Association and banned from the association in 1897 after internal conflict with hospital staff (who accused him of incompetence), but was exonerated by an open enquiry by the Hospital Board. In 1899 he was appointed physician to the infectious diseases unit at the hospital, Adelaide City Coroner, Inspector of Anatomy and chairman of the Central Board of Health.

In 1901 during the South African War he was surgeon captain, Imperial Bushmen's Corps and officer in charge of plague administration at Cape Town.

Smith was suspended from coronial duties in 1903 after 18 charges were laid against him of the misuse of human remains, specifically the removal of heads and the collection of skeletons for medical research, including that of well-known and popular local identity, Tommy Walker. A board of inquiry headed by James George Russell found that Smith's actions had been "indiscreet" and he was dismissed from his position as coroner. He was reinstated as coroner and head of the health department and his research praised, but had to resign from his hospital and other duties.

In 1904 Smith graduated DSc from the University of Adelaide, and published A Manual for Coroners. In his spare time made a special study of Aboriginal Australians. Smith was the author of The Aborigines of Australia, which was printed in volume three of the Official Year Book of the Commonwealth of Australia (1910), in which he criticised misrepresentation of Aboriginal people, suggesting review of "our knowledge of [their] beliefs and actions" and referring to them as the "most interesting [race] at present on earth and the least deserving to be exterminated by us and the most wronged at our hands".

In 1906 he was elected a Fellow of the Royal Society of Edinburgh. His proposers were Sir William Turner, Daniel John Cunningham, Alexander Crum Brown and Cargill Gilston Knott.

In 1913 he published Medical Jurisprudence from the Judicial Standpoint, for which he received the degree of MD from Edinburgh University.

In 1915 was in charge of the Australian General Hospital, Australian Imperial Force, Heliopolis, Egypt.  There, he clashed with principal matron Bell over which of them should manage the nursing staff. An Inquiry resulted in both being recalled to Australia.

On his return to Adelaide, Smith resumed his duties at the board of health and contributed to the Australian Encyclopaedia, including a large part of the "Aborigines" article. Following a trip to the South Seas Smith published In Southern Seas (1924), the second half of which is mostly about Aboriginal peoples.

Smith retired in 1929 and published a book Myths & legends of the Australian Aboriginals (1930), a collection of narratives as told to Smith by David Unaipon, who had been engaged as Smith's assistant, though later research has determined that Unaipon had sold the text to finance his own work. Authorship of the book, which at the time was criticised as dominated by "white thinking" has now been properly attributed to Unaipon and republished under his name as Legendary tales of the Australian Aborigines . Smith has also been accused of sales of Aboriginal artefacts for profit.

Anthropological collection
Smith was responsible for the bulk of Edinburgh University's physical anthropology collection, some 500 to 600 individuals.

From Smith's writings, it is clear that he was aware of Indigenous funerary customs."After death no reference is made to the deceased, nor is his name mentioned. Relations by the same name find a substitute. A mother would not give [me] a lock of her child’s hair because she has been taught that if the child dies, its spirit will find no rest if that lock of hair survives." 
As desecration of human remains was illegal, he used his position as Adelaide's coroner to illicitly dissect and collect human remains, many being individuals of unusual pathologies or disease, most of which he presented to Edinburgh University. His writings indicate that he also robbed graves and it is believed he had once destroyed five graves to obtain one good specimen. Witnesses also record that he practiced his marksmanship with a .303 rifle on corpses at the mortuary of Adelaide hospital. While he did not receive payment for the remains, he was rewarded for his "donations" with Fellowship of the Royal Society of Edinburgh (upon the proposal of Sir William Turner, Daniel John Cunningham, Alexander Crum Brown and Cargill Gilston Knott) and an Honorary Fellowship of the Royal Anthropological Institute. He was an honorary member of the Association of Military Surgeons of the United States.

He was responsible for the collection of human remains of Indigenous Australians, including remains stolen from burial grounds at Hindmarsh Island, some of which were shipped to overseas institutions. At his death in 1937, 182 skulls were found in his Adelaide home.

In addition to numerous books, Smith also published pamphlets and contributed largely to scientific journals and Chambers Encyclopaedia. He was interested in literature, philosophy and music, and earned a reputation as an authority on Aboriginal Australians.

Death
Smith spent his final years quietly among his books at Belair, South Australia, where he died on 28 September 1937. Smith had married Margaret, daughter of James Mackenzie, on 1 June 1889, who predeceased him. Four daughters and a son survived him.

Legacy
He is remembered mainly for his desecration of human remains, a legacy which is grimly symbolised in artist Yhonnie Scarce's work In the Dead House, a glass art installation for the 2020 Adelaide Biennial of Australian Art housed in the building which was used as the morgue of the old Adelaide Lunatic Asylum.

References

Sources

1859 births
1937 deaths
19th-century Scottish medical doctors
20th-century Scottish medical doctors
Alumni of the University of Edinburgh
Academics of the University of Edinburgh
British coroners
Australian military personnel of World War I
Australian anthropologists
Australian coroners
Australian encyclopedists
Australian pathologists
Australian public servants
Australian travel writers
Fellows of the Royal Society of Edinburgh
Medical jurisprudence
People from Banff and Buchan
Scottish anatomists
Scottish anthropologists
Scottish civil servants
Scottish emigrants to Australia
Scottish encyclopedists
Scottish naturalists
Scottish pathologists
Scottish schoolteachers
Scottish soldiers
Scottish surgeons
Scottish zoologists
University of Adelaide alumni
Australian military personnel of the Second Boer War
20th-century surgeons